Hugo Ragelli Oliveira Andrade  (born 2 May 1995), known as Hugo Ragelli, is a Brazilian professional footballer who plays as a forward for Nacional AM.

Club career
He made his professional debut in the Campeonato Brasileiro Série A for Cruzeiro on 30 November 2014 in a game against Chapecoense and scored an equalizer for his team in 1–1 draw.

References

External links

1995 births
Sportspeople from Minas Gerais
Living people
Brazilian footballers
Association football forwards
Campeonato Brasileiro Série A players
Cruzeiro Esporte Clube players
Associação Atlética Ponte Preta players
Gil Vicente F.C. players
Coimbra Esporte Clube players
Tupi Football Club players
Brazilian expatriate footballers
Expatriate footballers in Portugal
Liga Portugal 2 players